Medical Center (also known as Calling Dr. Gannon) is an American medical drama series that aired on CBS from 1969 to 1976. It was produced by MGM Television.

Plot
The show starred James Daly as Dr. Paul Lochner and Chad Everett as Dr. Joe Gannon, surgeons working in an otherwise unnamed university hospital in Los Angeles. The show focused both on the lives of the doctors and the patients showcased each week. At the core of the series was the tension between youth and experience, as seen between Drs. Lochner and Gannon. Besides his work as a surgeon, Gannon, because of his age, also worked as the head of the student health department at the university.  Helping the doctors was the very efficient Nurse Eve Wilcox, played by Audrey Totter. She started out as a bit role, but was eventually upgraded to co‑star status starting in 1972. Wilcox became a regular after two other similar nurses (Nurse Chambers, played by Jayne Meadows; and Nurse Murphy played by Jane Dulo) had basically served the same functions as Wilcox.

Cast
 James Daly as Dr. Paul Lochner
 Chad Everett as Dr. Joe Gannon
 Chris Hutson as Nurse Courtland
 Virginia Hawkins as Nurse Evvie Canford
 Daniel Silver as Anesthesiologist
 Audrey Totter as Nurse Eve Wilcox
 Corinne Camacho as Dr. Jeanne Bartlett
 Eugene Peterson as Dr. Merrill Weller
 Ed Hall as Dr. Stan Bricker
 Jayne Meadows as Nurse Chambers
 Fred Holliday as Dr. Barnes
 Jane Adrian as Nurse Joyce Baxter

Production

Pilot
The series' pilot film, U.M.C., was televised on CBS on April 17, 1969, starring Edward G. Robinson as Dr. Lee Forestman and Richard Bradford as Dr. Joe Gannon, with Daly and Totter appearing in the roles they  later played in the series; the film also starred Kim Stanley, Maurice Evans, Kevin McCarthy, and Shelley Fabares. In the film, a widow accused Dr. Gannon of allowing her husband to die, so his heart could be implanted into Dr. Forestman, who was a mentor and friend to Dr. Gannon.

The pilot telefilm was released as a part of the  Manufacture-on-Demand  Warner Archive Collection from Warner Bros. on January 12, 2010, as Operation Heartbeat. Warner Archive titles are available exclusively through Warner's online store and only in the United States.

Cancellation
At the time the show was cancelled, it tied with Marcus Welby, M.D. (which also ran from 1969 to 1976) as the longest-running medical drama on television at that point.

Episodes

Ratings
The show's Nielsen ratings are as follows:

Home media
Warner Bros. has released the seven seasons on DVD in Region 1 via their Warner Archive Collection. These are manufacture-on-demand  releases, available exclusively through Warner's online store and Amazon.com.

References

External links

 
 

1969 American television series debuts
1976 American television series endings
1970s American medical television series
Best Drama Series Golden Globe winners
CBS original programming
English-language television shows
Television series by MGM Television
Television shows set in Los Angeles